There are more than 200 shipwrecks in the territorial waters surrounding Puerto Rico, which include the main island and smaller ones (such as Isla de Mona, which has at least 20). Almost half (45%) of the shipwreck incidents that took place during the first 150 years of Spanish settlement were at San Juan, with most ships being lost due to the ongoing military conflicts and weather conditions (predominantly tropical cyclones). In modern times, the San Juan Bay has been subject to dredging initiatives that have adversely impacted the sites, with part of the wrecks now contained within an artificial island, remaining unexplored. On August 7, 1987, Public Law 10 created the Council for the Study of Subaquatic Arqueological Sites and Resources, allowing the  registry of underwater remains by archeologists. However, the entity was defunded in 2013 and has remained inactive since then. As of 2020, the documents pertaining to the shipwrecks in Puerto Rican waters remain under the custody of the Council's former director, Juan Vera.

The handling of items found in sunken ships has been historically contentious, including proposals to fund the 2010 Central American and Caribbean Games with the loot of two galleons believed to have belonged to the fleet of Francis Drake. Between the 16th and 17th centuries, there were at least 22 attempts at salvaging shipwrecks, which were mostly done independently and which employed smaller vessels. Government officials and citizens with ties to the ventures benefited from the subsequent auctions, in the case of politicians against royal laws. The protocol only allowed the wrecks that were reported within a day to be favored with a salvage operation, including the registry and auction of the cargo, with the government taking a fraction for its involvement. The practice of caretakers selling the merchandise under circumstances unfavorable to the merchants eventually lead to a reform in 1550, where sold under the supervision of the Casa de Contratación and items were classified as "belongings of the dead" and shipped to Spain.

History

Early settlement
During the early 16th century, San Juan Bautista (modern-day Puerto Rico) and Mona served as a supply stops for vessels traveling from Europe to the West Indies. Colonization efforts began in earnest during 1508 and were led by Juan Ponce de León, first achieving a diplomatic political accord that allowed the development of Spanish infrastructure and the elaboration of local supplies, but eventually leading to the Spanish–Taíno War of San Juan–Borikén. With the discovery of gold in the region surrounding Daguao (modern-day Luquillo and adjacent areas) during the conflict and the Spanish gaining ground, a new economy based on mining was created and proved lucrative. With more than 23,000 Castellanos being mined in its early years, the quantity surprised the Crown and led to the king noting his satisfaction and surprise at the quantity in a letter to Nicolás de Ovando y Cáceres, Governor and Captain-General of the Indies. Fueled by Spanish expansionism and slave incursions, San Juan would also serve a military role in the appeasing of the Lesser Antilles, which were populated by refugees from the war who joined local natives.

The island would become the first Spanish harbor to be encountered after the transatlantic voyages and the last stop before them, gaining importance as a supply stop, a support station and a center of information. It also became the first place to become aware of several shipwrecks abroad and in the adjacent Lesser Antilles (which usually received local first aid) and where legal disputes concerning these started. The island was also used to hold cargo and tributes from other colonies in the New World, including the fifth. The Mona Passage also served as a point of navigational importance during these voyages, being used by vessels that wished to avoid the large quantity of pirates found off the north coast of Hispaniola and was used by the New Spain Fleet after the military value of the island increased. Puerto Rico also became one of the stops for ships damaged in the dangerous marine topography surrounding the Bahamas and the Bahamian Channel. After the establishment of Castillo de San Marcos at St. Augustine, Florida, which was accomplished with two vessels from Puerto Rico, the peninsula and the greater Antilles formed the cornerstone of a Spanish offensive in the region led by the Menéndez de Avilés fleet. Towards the century's end, the vessels of this armada would wait for fleets headed to the mainland at Puerto Rico, from where they escorted them. During this time, an additional force of galleys was assigned to the West Indies, but rarely visited Puerto Rico and resulted in an economic hindrance (due to a repair tax) that led to their eventual abolishment of the tax in 1590.

With the original town of Puerto Rico (modern-day San Juan) serving as its main port and San Germán complementing it, trading and transportation of items and treasure to Spain would gain importance during the first half of the 16th century. During the 1510s, a decline in the forced work force led to the introduction of African slaves, opening another maritime market with the approval of the Spanish Crown. With a decline in the Spanish population, slaves would serve as the bulk of the island's work force, both in mining and the subsequent agricultural economy that followed. When the vessels used to combat the natives failed to counter European assailants including pirates, buccaneers and privateers, the Spanish began a number of defense measures that began with the introduction of fleets, armadas and armadillas. These were only able to provide temporary defense and the enemy attacks were constant against the towns, a pattern that led to the creation of military defenses around them. In Puerto Rico, the construction of walls and castles took place on San Juan, where the largest Spanish fortress in the Western Hemisphere was built. However, other ports were not as fortified, leaving them more vulnerable to buccaneer incursions and dependent on a warning system known as avisos. This initiative also led to an increase in the slanting vessels authorized to trade in the island.

Ilicit trade, pirates and privateers
By the mid-century, the mining economy gave way to new ventures, such as agriculture, which also affected the flow of vessels to Puerto Rico (and the West Indies in general) which combined with unfavorable naval provisions (???) and the proliferation of pirates in the Mona Passage, resulting in a recession. The local government made a number of requests to the Crown asking that smaller vessels were allowed to trade in the West Indies, which resulted in an increase of vessels from the Canary Islands which brought cheaper goods, a more flexible bargain system and reduced inflation concerns.  The Greater Antilles also benefited from other measures (???) meant to strengthen the local trade economy, but the influx of vessels was reduced and inflation returned, which in turn lead to the citizens depending less on the Spanish shipments and seeking alternatives such as smuggling contraband. Foreigners benefitted from the enterprise and while some were caught in the act, the protagonism of San Juan in the trade resulted in government officials becoming accomplices in other, less favored, regions of the island and attracting figures like John Hawkins. Efforts to avoid the prospection of clients by smugglers in the Canary Islands resulted in it being barred from to the Caribbean trade, also affecting Puerto Rico. The port town of San Germán became increasingly vulnerable with the developments of other settlements, such as Guayanilla, becoming increasingly dependent on contraband. During the 1560s, the new fleet system only granted Puerto Rico a single ship, which resulted in insufficient merchandise and exorbitant prices, in the process fueling illegal trade. Despite measures being taken by the Crown to punish collaborators, the practice flourished for the following centuries. Dutch urcas became a common sight in the Mona Passage, while French and English ships were also prevalent as those countries expanded into the New World. 

Later in the century, Puerto Rico would be used as a route to funnel the tithe to Spain through the local bishopric which was in charge of several of the Lesser Antilles, with even tribute from Central America being sent there for delivery. Pearls extracted from South America were also relayed to local ports, creating a venture that would extend for the next 200 years. Trade of other resources, such as fish and slaves, also served as part of the economic symbiosis of San Juan and the adjacent Spanish settlements. However, restrictions on the European shipments bound to the West Indies worsened inflation, forcing the local government to request aid, which came in the form of merchandise being allowed in smaller independent vessels and other exemptions that went over the Casa de Cobtratación. However, a few merchants exploited this arrangement to their benefit. As they expanded in the Americas, English spying, attacks and incursions became common in Puerto Rico, being carried by figures such as Walter Raleigh and Francis Drake, joining the already prevalent foreign smugglers.

After the capture of enemy vessels became profitable to the population during the 1580s, fleets of privateers were dispatched to take the burden of the military (especially in the Easter coast and the nearby islands), creating a venture that proved both successful and lucrative for the next centuries, giving rise to figures such as Miguel Enríquez. Sanctioned by the governor, local practice preceded the first formal privateer license, which was granted by the Spanish monarchy on May 7, 1625. In the 1690s, a Guarda Costas fleet was established to protect the Puerto Rican coasts, but some privateers continued being sanctioned by the governor. 

Entering the next century, trade mostly benefitted traders from the Canary Islands, while San Juan retained its control over the European imports and San Germán received other resources from the adjacent islands and South America. Smuggling was still rampant throughout the Caribbean and with the war between the naval powers reaching a ceasefire, measures were taken to combat the practice. During the 1620s, war erupted between Spain and the Netherlands. The conflict reached Puerto Rico in 1625, when the Dutch attacked during the Third Battle of San Juan. By the mid-century, privateers and pirates became more abundant in the waters surrounding the Spanish West Indies while foreign nations kept expanding through the Lesser Antilles, Puerto Rico's economy was threatened by the loss of trade and its situado being captured and lost at sea several times. Despite efforts being done to favor San Juan over La Aguada, that region retained its popularity as a re-supply stop.

Modern view

Research and documentation
Unlike other research venues in Puerto Rico, marine archeology was lethargic in its growth. Until the latter half of the 20th century, public access on the documentation of the local shipwrecks was limited and featured on Shipwrecks of the Western Hemisphere, 1493-1825 by Robert Marx and Diccionario Bibliográfico-Histórico Comentado de Puerto Rico by Adolfo de Hostos. In 1983, Miguel Pagán Mir published a specialized book on the shipwrecks surrounding Mona Island, Naufragios en Aguas de Isla de Mona. These early documents, however, had some factual errors that were disseminated in other sources. Despite this, 19th and 20th century wrecks were covered in newspapers and other publications that were relatively accessible. Older incidents, however, required research into the collection of Spanish-era papers available to the University of Puerto Rico at Río Piedras.

A find by Miguel Pagán Mir and Jaime Braulio managed to be recreated in the A Marine Atlas of Puerto Rico. During the 1970s, a wreck was found at San Juan's harbor, which was researched to some extent. The following decade, the Institute of Puerto Rican Culture took an interest in the subject to attend issues on lack of documentation and in an effort to deal with treasure hunters. In 1987, legislation was passed two years after Mel Fisher claimed to have found a galleon off the coast of Vieques. This was, however, mostly in response to an increment in marine treasure hunting within the waters of Puerto Rico. A committee was created within the ICP to study the area. However, this increase in interest also lead to formal study stagnating. In 1989, Walter Cardona published the first sociocultural study on the subject sourced by contemporary documents, after becoming interested in the subject when Pagán Mir (also one of his friends) was involved in the discovery of a shipwreck off the northern coast.

Salvage of Spanish-American ships
The salvage of the Manuela and Cristobal Colón, two steamships intentionally scuttled on May 6, 1898 in anticipation of the bombardment of San Juan, took place in 2001 as part of a project to dredge and expand the entrance of the San Juan Bay. Items found within were preserved for museum exhibition. The vessels themselves were refloated and laid to rest near the site of another shipwreck of that conflict, the Antonio López.

Proposed salvage of Drake's fleet
In 1991 a fisherman recovered several vase pieces, leading to the discovery of two British galleons off the coast of the municipalities of Aguadilla and Isabella. The find was reported to the ICP by the Puerto Rican Academy of Professional Diving, but the distribution of profit from the sale of items deemed "non essential" caused a conflict between its president Efraín Acevedo and the government, with the latter declining to accept 50% of the profits (as the conservation of the pieces was to take precedence). In 2009, former senator Evelyn Vázquez (who is related to Acevedo, as he was the best man of her wedding) presented a bill to promote the salvage of the shipwrecks and the sale of its contents, valued in 1,000-2,000 million dollars, in order to fund the 2010 Central American and Caribbean Games. The proposal was subjected to ridicule, and was ultimately dismissed by the administration as it would require several policy amendments to become practical.

Timeline of historical wrecks

 A number of wrecks listed by Pierre Chaunu, Robert F. Marx, Adolfo de Hostos and Orrin H. Pilkey are modified and/or omitted due to errors in location or conflicting/absent official records supporting the purported relation with Puerto Rican waters. A number of vessels identified as galleons by Miguel Pagán Mir have been corrected to their actual model using primary sources. Captain Diego Bernal, misnamed as "Domingo" by Alejandro Tapia y Rivera and several authors that followed, has been corrected with primary sources. An editor's mistake in Fray Íñigo Abbad y Lasierra's account of the Santa María de Jesús has been corrected.

References
Notes
 

Citations

Bibliography